Count Christian Karl Reinhard of Leiningen-Dagsburg-Falkenburg (17 July 1695, Mülheim an der Ruhr – 17 November 1766, Heidesheim am Rhein) was a German nobleman.

Life
Christian Karl Reinhard was the son of John, Count of Leiningen-Dagsburg-Falkenburg (17 March 1662 - 3 November 1698), and his wife, Countess Johanna Magdalene of Hanau-Lichtenberg (18 December 1660 - 21 August 1715).

After the early death of the father's Christian guardian, Count Council and Commissioner John Arnold Kielmann, he was invested in June 1701, by Elector Palatine Johann Wilhelm with the Lordship of  Broich.  His family soon left because of the threat of the War of the Spanish Succession to Schloss Broich.

Marriage and children 
Christian Karl Reinhard married on 27 November 1726 in Mettenheim, to Countess Katharina Polyxena of Solms-Rödelheim (January 30, 1702 - March 29, 1765), and had the following children:

 Johann Karl Ludwig of Leiningen-Dagsburg-Falkenburg (6 October 1727, Heidenheim – 20 March 1734)
 Countess Maria Louise Albertine of Leiningen-Dagsburg-Falkenburg (16 March 1729, Heidenheim – 11 March 1818, Neustrelitz); married on 16 March 1748 Prince George William of Hesse-Darmstadt (11 July 1722 – 21 June 1782)
 Countess Polyxene Wilhelmine of Leiningen-Dagsburg-Falkenburg (8 August 1730, Castle Heidenheim – 21 March 1800); married on 27 March 1752, Count Ludwig Emich of Leiningen (22 December 1709 – 23 September 1766)
 Countess Sophie Charlotte Franziska of Leiningen-Dagsburg-Falkenburg (28 October 1731, Castle Heidenheim – 20 January 1781)
 Countess Alexandrine of Leiningen-Dagsburg-Falkenburg (25 November 1732, Frankfurt am Main – 4 October 1809); married on 25 October 1770 in Frankfurt am Main, Heinrich XI, Prince Reuss of Greiz (18 March 1722 – 28 June 1800)
 Countess Caroline Felizitas of Leiningen-Dagsburg-Falkenburg (22 May 1734, Heidenheim – 8 May 1810, Frankfurt am Main); married 16 April 1760, Charles William, Prince of Nassau-Usingen (9 November 1735 – 17 May 1803) and had issue.

Ancestry

References

External links
"Christian Karl Reinhard (Leiningen-Dagsburg-Falkenburg)", German Wikipedia

Counts of Germany
1695 births
1766 deaths
Lords of Broich
Leiningen family